Tavernole sul Mella is a comune in the province of Brescia, in Lombardy. It is located on the river Mella, in the upper Trompia valley.  The main sight is the medieval church of San Filiastro, housing 15th-century paintings.

References

Cities and towns in Lombardy